The Hockey East Championship was held in Boston from its inception in 2003 until 2007. The event was held at Northeastern's Matthews Arena in 2003 and 2004 before moving to BU's Walter Brown Arena in 2005. The tournament returned to Matthews Arena in 2006, was held at UNH's Whittemore Center in 2007, and at UConn's Mark Edward Freitas Ice Forum in 2008. The tournament went back to UNH in 2009, Providence in 2010, and the last campus to host was Boston University in 2011. The tournament moved to Hyannis MA in 2012 and was held there until 2015. In 2016, the tournament was moved to team venues.

Champions

References
General

Specific

External links

College ice hockey in the United States lists